Road hog or roadhog may mean:

 an aggressive motorist, inclined to road rage
 Road hogs,  an amateur style of stock car racing